The 2018 All-Ireland Senior Football Championship Final was the 131st final of the All-Ireland Senior Football Championship and the culmination of the 2018 All-Ireland Senior Football Championship in Gaelic football. The match was played at Croke Park in Dublin on 2 September 2018.

It was the second time the teams had met in the final; Dublin won the first encounter in 1995. It was the third consecutive year that a team qualified under the system of second chances introduced in 2001; Tyrone qualified despite defeat in its provincial championship.

Dublin won the final by a margin of six points, on a scoreline of 2–17 to 1–14. The victory was Dublin's fourth consecutive All-Ireland title, making them the third county to win "four-in-a-row" (the others are Wexford in 1915–18 and Kerry in 1929–32 and 1978–81).

The game was televised nationally on RTÉ2 as part of The Sunday Game live programme, presented by Michael Lyster from Croke Park, with studio analysis from Joe Brolly, Pat Spillane, and Colm O'Rourke. Match commentary was provided by Ger Canning with analysis by Dessie Dolan. This was the last occasion on which Michael Lyster presented RTÉ's television coverage, having decided to retire from The Sunday Game at the end of 2018. The game was also televised internationally by Sky Sports, presented by Rachel Wyse and Brian Carney.

Paths to the final

Dublin

Leinster Championship

Dublin won the Leinster Championship and so advanced directly to the quarter-final group stage.

All-Ireland Quarter-Final Group Stage (Super 8s)

Dublin finished first in Group 2 and advanced to the All-Ireland semi-final, to play the team who placed second in Group 1 - Galway.

All-Ireland Semi-Final

Tyrone

Ulster Championship

Having been beaten by Monaghan, Tyrone were eliminated from the Ulster championship and entered Round 1 of the All-Ireland qualifiers.

All-Ireland Qualifiers

All-Ireland Quarter-Final Group Stage (Super 8s)

Tyrone finished second in Group 2, behind Dublin, and advanced to the All-Ireland semi-final, to play the winner of Group 2, Monaghan.

All-Ireland Semi-Final

Pre-match
The match had originally been scheduled for 26 August, but had to be moved to accommodate the visit of Pope Francis to Ireland, where he attended the World Meeting of Families. The final had been moved from its traditional date of the third Sunday of September to allow more time for club matches.

Tyrone's RTÉ boycott
On Monday 20 August 2018, just under two weeks before the final, the Irish Independent reported that RTÉ had confirmed that Tyrone would not be involved in any media coverage with the national broadcaster surrounding the event. The boycott, considered a tradition at this stage in relation to Tyrone, involved for the first time an All-Ireland final, after which RTÉ airs television coverage from the hotel in which the winning team is booked to stay. This meant that, in the event of a Tyrone win, RTÉ would be unable to cover the after-match events as per usual, including interviews on the pitch with players and the management team. Tyrone's All-Ireland final boycott was a continuation of a seven-year blacklisting of RTÉ by the county, the cause of which was a radio sketch aired in 2011 on RTÉ Radio 1. The sketch incensed Tyrone, as it was deemed to be mocking Michaela Harte (daughter of Tyrone manager Mickey Harte), shortly after she was murdered while on honeymoon in Mauritius.

Former All-Ireland winning captain Peter Canavan suggested the timing of RTÉ's announcement was intended to put pressure on Tyrone.

Minor final
Kerry played Galway in the All-Ireland Minor Football Championship final which took place before the senior final. Kerry won the game on a 0–21 to 1–14 scoreline to complete a five in a row of All Ireland wins.

Jubilee team
The Derry team that won the 1993 All-Ireland Final were presented to the crowd before the senior match to mark 25 years.

Match

Officials
On 20 August, Cork's Conor Lane was confirmed as the referee for the final. He was previously in charge of the drawn final between Dublin and Mayo in 2016.

Team news
Tyrone made one change to the team from the semi-final win over Monaghan with Mark Bradley starting ahead of Lee Brennan. Despite fears of an injury to Cian O'Sullivan, Dublin named an unchanged side, with the same starting fifteen that overcame Galway three weeks earlier.

Summary
Dublin began the game unchanged with Tyrone making 2 late changes - Rory Brennan and Conor Meyler replaced Frank Burns and Richie Donnelly. Prior to the game, Dublin, as reigning All-Ireland champions for three consecutive years, were heavy favourites to win. They took an early lead after Dean Rock scored a free, but he put his next two efforts wide, allowing Tyrone to assert dominance for fifteen minutes. During this timeframe, the Ulster team opened up a four-point lead, with the score poised at 0–05 to 0–01 in favour of Mickey Harte's side. However, the tide of the game turned once more in a dramatic, as Paul Mannion was fouled in Tyrone's penalty box, leading Conor Lane to award a penalty to Dublin, which Mannion calmly slotted home. Coupled with another successful free from Rock, this left the teams equal with five points apiece. Tyrone only managed to secure one more point in the remaining twenty-four minutes of the half, and their lack of clinicality in front of goal opened the door to a resurgent Dublin side. In the twenty-eighth minute, Dublin pulled further ahead courtesy of another goal. Con O'Callaghan took the ball deep into Tyrone territory before offloading to Niall Scully, who calmly fisted it into Niall Morgan's unguarded net. Thus, the teams headed in at half-time with Dublin seven points to the good, having racked up 2–07 to Tyrone's 0–06.

While Tyrone reduced the deficit by two early in the second half, with points from Connor McAliskey and Kieran McGeary narrowing Dublin's margin somewhat, the team in blue, affectionately known as "the Dubs", had accumulated an unassailable lead. The second thirty-five minutes were not entirely without incident, however; Dublin had pulled further out of sight, with points from Ciarán Kilkenny and Brian Fenton further diminishing whatever minuscule chances Tyrone had at mounting a comeback. However, in the sixty-sixth minute, Tyrone were given a late opportunity to draw near again, as Philly McMahon brought down Colm Cavanagh with a rash challenge, granting Tyrone a penalty - this was coolly dispatched by Peter Harte, breaching Stephen Cluxton's net for the first time in the game. Later, John Small was given a second yellow card, and ergo sent off, leaving Dublin to finish with just fourteen men. Ultimately, a point at the death from Kevin McManamon put the victory beyond any doubt. Conor Lane, the County Cork native, blew the final whistle, confirming Dublin's victory with a margin of six points. The final score was 2–17 to 1–14. The man of the match award was bestowed upon Jack McCaffrey, who received the award ahead of his other nominated teammates, Kilkenny and Mannion.

As captain, goalkeeper Stephen Cluxton, making his 200th appearance for the county, lifted the Sam Maguire Cup aloft from the Hogan Stand. The win represented Dublin's fourth consecutive win under the management of Jim Gavin, a feat only previously achieved by two other counties - Kerry and Wexford. It also further extended Dublin's unbeaten run in the Championship; the side was last beaten in 2014.

Details

Trophy presentation
Dublin captain Stephen Cluxton accepted the Sam Maguire Cup from GAA president John Horan in the Hogan Stand.

Reaction
Highlights of the final were shown on The Sunday Game programme which aired at 9:30 pm that night on RTÉ2 and was presented by Des Cahill. Paul Mannion, Jack McCaffrey and Ciarán Kilkenny were shortlisted for the Man of the Match award. The winner was Jack McCaffrey with GAA president John Horan presenting the award at the Dublin post match function, held in the Gibson hotel.

Celebrations
The Dublin team had a homecoming celebration the day after the final at Smithfield in Dublin which started at 6:30 pm with Marty Morrissey as MC.	
The night before, players and their management team celebrated their win at The Gibson Hotel.

See also
 Tír Eoghain: The Unbreakable Bond, a documentary shown one week in advance of the game

References

Final
All-Ireland Senior Football Championship Final, 2018
All-Ireland Senior Football Championship Finals
Dublin county football team matches
Tyrone county football team matches
All-Ireland Senior Football Championship Final